We're Only Human (previously The Incredible Kidda Band and The Kicks) were an English powerpop and rock band, formed in London on 1 July 1981, and composed of Alan Hammonds (guitar and vocals), John Rollason (guitar and backing vocals), Keith Taylor (bass) and Mark "Tarky" Bates (drums and backing vocals).

The band were helped in the recording studio by producer Graham "Kidder" Hammonds (percussion and backing vocals).

Career
Having played regularly at The Bridgehouse in Canning Town, the band joined Terry Murphy's own Vinyl Cuts record label, in order to release their debut single, "Hold Your Head Up High" and "I Wouldn't Treat a Dog (Like You Treat Me)" in June 1985. Murphy was also manager of Wasted Youth and father to the actor, Glen Murphy. The single was recorded at Village Recorders on 19 March 1985, with the session being produced by Hammonds and engineered by Gary Edwards. Both sides of the single were cut by George Peckham, and the run-out groove on both sides of the single bear his motto, 'A Porky Prime Cut'. 

In 1987, guitarist John Rollason took time out from the band to record The Dirty Strangers album with the Dirty Strangers.

We're Only Human disbanded in 1989.

In 2000, due to public demand for their back catalogue, the debut album, Too Much Too Little Too Late was released by Detour Records. The double album contained twenty nine tracks and featured both studio and demo recordings. The album received favorable reviews, particularly edition 254 of Record Collector in October that year. 

In 2002, the first four singles were repackaged and re-released by the Japanese independent record label, 1977 Records.

On 24 February 2006, Hammonds and Lister were featured on 'Pop Into The Past' with Pete Chambers on BBC Coventry and Warwickshire Radio. 

On 28 March 2007, Pop 'Til You Drop, the lyric book to accompany the album Too Much Too Little Too Late was published by Lulu. The album itself was re-released on 20 June 2007, on the band's own Black and Blue Records label, through Detour Records. In 2007, "Sign on the Dotted Line" was re-recorded by the Teenage Frames. In 2008, "If Looks Could Kill" was re-recorded by the New York based Baby Shakes, and the song continues to be part of their live repertoire. This was followed by The Brothers Gross' covers of "I'm Gonna Join the Army" and "We're Gonna Make It". Many other cover versions continue to surface. 

During 2011, Last Laugh Records from New York released a series of single releases of Kidda Band material including the unreleased "Radio Caroline" and "(Watch out) Thief" plus a reissue of "Everybody Knows".  In December 2011, Red Lounge Records from Germany released a vinyl version of the Too Much Too Little Too Late album in a repackaged format. In 2012, Last Laugh Records also re-released "Fighting My Way Back" and the unreleased "Bitch/She's a 50".

Discography

Singles
 "Hold Your Head Up High" / "I Wouldn't Treat a Dog (Like You Treat Me)" (1983) - Vinyl Cuts Records VC002

Albums
 Too Much Too Little Too Late (CD) (19 June 2000) Detour Records DRCD 023
 Too Much Too Little Too Late (Vinyl) (19 June 2000) Detour Records DRLP 023
 Too Much Too Little Too Late (CD Reissue) (20 June 2007) Detour Records DRCD 023
 Too Much Too Little Too Late (Vinyl - Repackaged) (9 December 2011) Red Lounge Records RLR095

References

External links
 The Incredible Kidda Band Official Website
 The Incredible Kidda Band on MySpace
 The Kicks on MySpace
 The We’re Only Human on MySpace
 The Mod Pop Punk Archives
 Avery Hill College Campus
 45 Catalogue 
 Kidda Band interview on BBC Coventry and Warwickshire Radio

English rock music groups
Musical groups established in 1981
Musical groups disestablished in 1989
English new wave musical groups